Cychrus quadrisetifer is a species of ground beetle in the subfamily of Carabinae. It was described by Imura in 1998.

References

quadrisetifer
Beetles described in 1998